John Leamy may refer to:

 John Leamy (hurler) (born 1964), retired Irish hurler
 John Leamy (merchant) (1757–1839), American trader with Spanish colonies